This is a list of Billboard magazine's Top Hot 100 songs of 1964. The Top 100, as revealed in the edition of Billboard dated January 2, 1965, is based on Hot 100 charts from the issue dates of January 4 through December 12, 1964.

See also
1964 in music
List of Billboard Hot 100 number-one singles of 1964
List of Billboard Hot 100 top-ten singles in 1964

References

1964 record charts
Billboard charts